Andreea Mogoș (born 2 June 1988) is a Romanian-born Italian wheelchair fencer. She competed at the 2016 Summer Paralympics, winning a bronze medal in Women's team foil, and at the 2020 Summer Paralympics, winning a silver medal in Women's foil team.

References

External links
 

1988 births
Living people
Paralympic wheelchair fencers of Italy
Paralympic silver medalists for Italy
Paralympic bronze medalists for Italy
Medalists at the 2016 Summer Paralympics
Medalists at the 2020 Summer Paralympics
Paralympic medalists in wheelchair fencing
Wheelchair fencers at the 2016 Summer Paralympics
Wheelchair fencers at the 2020 Summer Paralympics
Paralympic athletes of Fiamme Oro
Sportspeople from Vaslui